The American Wargamer was a wargaming magazine first published in 1973.

History and profile
The American Wargamer was a medium-sized newsletter, the official publication of the American Wargaming Association. The first issue appeared in December 1973. Gene McCoy was the founder. The title was renamed Military Digest in 1984 with volume 11, no. 11. It lasted until May 2000. The publisher was McCoy Publishing Enterprises and the headquarters was in Middleton, Wisconsin.

Reception
Steve Jackson reviewed The American Wargamer in The Space Gamer No. 32. Jackson commented that "This seems to be for the serious historical wargame fan - the person who plays a lot of wargames of different periods, likes to talk about them, like to write about them, likes to read about them, likes to argue about them. If you're a 'club' wargamer you may find it worthwhile to join AWA and get American Wargamer. If you're purely into science fiction, fantasy, or role-playing, here may not be much here for you."

Reviews
Alarums and Excursions #11

References

Defunct magazines published in the United States
Hobby magazines published in the United States
Magazines established in 1973
Magazines disestablished in 2000
Magazines published in Wisconsin
Mass media in Madison, Wisconsin
Newsletters
Wargaming magazines